Receptor activity modifying protein 2, also known as RAMP2, is a protein which in humans is encoded by the RAMP2 gene.

Function 

The protein encoded by this gene is a member of the RAMP family of single-transmembrane-domain proteins, called receptor (calcitonin) activity modifying proteins (RAMPs). RAMPs are type I transmembrane proteins with an extracellular N-terminus and a cytoplasmic C-terminus. RAMPs are required to transport calcitonin-receptor-like receptor (CRLR) to the plasma membrane. CRLR, a receptor with seven transmembrane domains, can function as either a calcitonin gene-related peptide (CGRP) receptor or an adrenomedullin receptor, depending on which members of the RAMP family are expressed.  In the presence of this (RAMP2) protein, CRLR functions as an adrenomedullin receptor. The RAMP2 protein is involved in core glycosylation and transportation of adrenomedullin receptor to the cell surface.

References

Further reading

External links